London Connects was jointly owned by the Greater London Authority and London Councils. Its purpose was to improve public services in London and reduce their cost through collaborative use of technology. Partners included London Health agencies, London Development Agency, Transport for London, London Fire and Emergency Planning Authority, Metropolitan Police Service, London Grid for Learning, London Libraries Development Agency, London Metropolitan Network, Learning and Skills Council and the London Voluntary Services Council. Achievements include the development of the London Portal and the London Public Service Network which provides secure broadband links between London authorities.  

The work programme was kept under strict review and revised as deemed appropriate by the London Connects Board and multi-sector Steering Group. Board members were appointed either by the Mayor of London or by the Leaders' Committee of London Councils.

London Connects was also the first organisation to set up a Warning, Advice & Reporting Point (WARP). This service facilitates information sharing and helps the London boroughs in the fight against electronic attack.

The programme was disbanded in 2009.

References

External links
 WARP UK
 London Portal

Information technology organisations based in the United Kingdom
Local government in London